Milkieston Rings is a prehistoric site, a hillfort near the village of Eddleston and about  north of Peebles, in the Scottish Borders, Scotland. It is a Scheduled Monument.

Description
The fort is on Milkieston Hill, a broad spur projecting north-west from Cavarra Hill. There has been quarrying and stone-robbing of the site, such that interpretation is difficult; two or three phases of construction have been suggested.

About a quarter of the interior of the fort has been severely damaged by quarrying; there are traces of two probable house-platforms in the remaining part. There are three or four outer ramparts, built subsequently.

References

Hill forts in Scotland
Archaeological sites in the Scottish Borders
Scheduled Ancient Monuments in the Scottish Borders